Venerable Mapalagama Wipulasara Maha Thera (3 March 1925 – 28 October 2000) was a Theravada Buddhist monk in Sri Lanka. He was also an artist and sculptor who has gained fame through his sculptures of Buddha statues that are worshiped in many places within Sri Lanka and abroad. He has held Exhibitions in Soviet Russia and China in the years 1961 and 1963 respectively.

National Emblem
Ven Mapalagama Wipulasara Maha Thera was the designer
 of the national emblem of Sri Lanka in 1972 under the direction of Dr Nissanka Wijeyeratne who was the Chairman of the National Emblem and Flag Design Committee at the time  and Art Work by S.M Seneviratne.

Paarama Dhamma Chethiya Pirivena
The Maha Thera was the chief monk of the Parama Dhamma Chethiya Pirivena in Ratmalana. This is an international Buddhist institute where novices and monks from Sri Lanka and other countries come and learn Buddhism, Sinhala, Pali, Sanskrit and English.

Honours
Ven Mapalagama Wipulasara Thera has gained many awards and titles from various countries for his services to the Buddhist community. In 1984 he was awarded the "Kalasoori Merit Award" by the Government of Sri Lanka.

References 

1925 births
2000 deaths
Sri Lankan Buddhist monks
Sri Lankan Theravada Buddhists
Buddhist artists
20th-century Buddhist monks